Wymysłowo is a settlement in the Kuyavian-Pomeranian Voivodeship, Poland, within the Gmina Tuchola, Tuchola County.

Notable places 
In the settlement is located the Indian Museum, the museum devoted to the culture of the indigenous peoples of North America. It is dedicated to Sat-Okh, book author and promoter of the culture of Native Americans, who claimed to be of Polish and Shawnee descent. However, his origins were heavily disputed, while his works were criticized for not accurate depictions of Native Americans.

References 

Villages in Tuchola County